Fenelton is an unincorporated community in Butler County, Pennsylvania, United States. Fenelton has a post office with ZIP code 16034, which opened on February 8, 1890. The population as of 2019 is 2,036.

References

Unincorporated communities in Butler County, Pennsylvania
Unincorporated communities in Pennsylvania